Stuart Ian Grimshaw (born 16 June 1961) is a former field hockey player from New Zealand, who was a member of the national team that finished seventh at the 1984 Summer Olympics in Los Angeles, California. He was born in Auckland, New Zealand.

He is now CEO of EZCORP Inc.

References

 
 http://www.ezcorp.com/about/who-we-are/leadership-team

External links
 

New Zealand male field hockey players
Olympic field hockey players of New Zealand
Field hockey players at the 1984 Summer Olympics
Field hockey players from Auckland
1961 births
Living people
New Zealand chief executives
Chief financial officers